Future of Forestry is an American indie rock band from Southern California, United States.

History 
Future of Forestry is led by multi-instrumentalist, composer, and producer Eric Owyoung. The name comes from a poem by C.S. Lewis, "The Future of Forestry". The project is currently based in Colorado.

The band started in 2006 and released its self-titled debut EP in 2006 under Credential Recordings (EMI). Their first full-length album, Twilight, appeared in 2007, but for the next several years, Owyoung and his collaborators focused on a series of EPs, the Travel series, with three volumes released between 2009 and 2010.

Another EP series, Advent, devoted to Advent-themed music, debuted in 2008, with additional installments appearing in 2010 and 2013. In 2011, the Travel series was collected on a single album, The Complete Travel Series, while the same year, the group issued another compilation, A Film and TV Collection, a limited-edition sampler of music Owyoung created for visual media.

For the 2012 album, Young Man Follow, Owyoung launched his own label, Sound Swan Records. He also opened his own studio, Utopia Road Studios, where he worked on Future of Forestry projects as well as recording and mixing work for other artists.

The following years yielded a 2014 release of the Piano & Strings Sessions, an EP of rearranged Future of Forestry songs orchestrated for piano, strings, and vocals only. In April 2015 an acoustic duet album called "Pages" was released as a surprise to fans on Future of Forestry's website and on iTunes. Pages was then later released on vinyl as the band's first vinyl pressing.

In 2016 the band released Awakened to the Sound, and then Union two years later.

Sound Swan Records 
Future of Forestry has released much of their own music on Sound Swan. 

Owyoung has also mixed, performed and attributed production work for former label mate, Jon Foreman's Sunlight, Shadows, Darkness and Dawn, remixes for Hillsong United's "Like an Avalanche", and Hillsong Young & Free's Heart of God. and helping produce Collington's EP In Between.

Members
Current
 Eric Owyoung – vocals, instruments

Former
 Luke Floeter – bass, keyboards
 TJ Hill – drums, percussion, vocals, trombone, guitar, vibraphone, organ, glockenspiel
 Spencer Kim – drums
 Nick Maybury – vocals, guitar, keyboards

Discography 

Studio albums

2007: Twilight – Credential Recordings
2011: A Film & TV Collection – Credential Recordings
2011: The Complete Travel Series - Rethink Records
2012: Young Man Follow - Sound Swan Records
2015: Pages - Sound Swan Records
2016: Awakened to the Sound - Sound Swan Records
2018: Union - Sound Swan Records
2021: Remember - Sound Swan Records
EPs

2006: Future of Forestry – Credential Recordings
2008: Advent: Christmas EP –  Credential Recordings
2009: Travel EP –  Credential Recordings
2009: Travel II EP –  Credential Recordings
2010: Travel III EP –  Credential Recordings
2010: Advent: Christmas EP Volume 2 –  Credential Recordings
2013: Advent: Christmas EP Volume 3 –  Credential Recordings
2014: The Piano and Strings Sessions - Instrumentals EP –  Sound Swan Records
2019: Light Has Come - Sound Swan Records
2021: Carry - Sound Swan Records

Singles
"Open Wide"

Compilation appearances
2006: Stereocilia Vol. 1 – Credential Recordings
2006: X2007 – Provident/Word/EMI
2006: X Worship 2007 – Provident/Word/EMI
2007: The Tour EP – Credential Recordings

Further reading

References

External links 
 
 Eric Owyoung interview @ Christian Music Today (02/07)
 Interview with Eric Owyoung about "Young Man Follow" on Episode 76 of The Collision Podcast (07/2012)

Christian rock groups from California
Credential Recordings artists
Musical groups established in 2006
Alternative rock groups from California
Musical groups from San Diego